Pixar or Pixar Animation Studios, is an American computer animation studio currently owned by Disney.

Pixar may also refer to:

 Pixar Canada, the former Canadian subsidiary of Pixar Animation Studios
 Pixar Image Computer, a graphics designing computer
 Pixar RenderMan, a 3D rendering software produced by Pixar Animation Studios